The 1941 Furman Purple Hurricane football team was an American football team that represented Furman University as a member of the Southern Conference (SoCon) during the 1941 college football season. In its 10th season under head coach Dizzy McLeod, the team compiled a 3–4–2 record (2–3–2 against conference opponents), finished in ninth place in the conference, and was outscored by a total of 195 to 129. The team played its home games at Sirrine Stadium in Greenville, South Carolina.

Schedule

References

Furman
Furman Paladins football seasons
Furman Purple Hurricane football